The Sorthat Formation is a geologic formation on the island of Bornholm, Denmark and in the Rønne Graben in the Baltic Sea. It is of Latest Pliensbachian to Late Toarcian age. Plant fossils have been recovered from the formation, along with several traces of invertebrate animals. The Sorthat Formation is overlain by fluvial to lacustrine gravels, along with sands, clay and in some places coal beds that are part of the Aalenian-Bathonian Bagå Formation. Until 2003, the Sorthat Formation was included as the lowermost part of the Bagå Formation, recovering the latest Pliensbachian to lower Aalenian boundary. The Sorthat strata reflect a mostly marginally deltaic to marine unit. Large streams fluctuated to the east, where a large river system was established at the start of the Toarcian. In the northwest, local volcanism that started in the lower Pliensbachian extended along the North Sea, mostly from southern Sweden. At this time, the Central Skåne Volcanic Province and the Egersund Basin expelled most of their material, with influences on the local tectonics. The Egersund Basin has abundant fresh porphyritic nephelinite lavas and dykes of lower Jurassic age, with a composition nearly identical to those found in the clay pits. That indicates the transport of strata from the continental margin by large fluvial channels of the Sorthat and the connected Röddinge Formation that ended in the sea deposits of the Ciechocinek Formation green series.

Stratigraphy 
 
On Bornholm, the lower-middle Jurassic succession is composed of the Rønne (Hettangian–Sinemurian), Hasle (lower–upper Pliensbachian), Sorthat and Bagå Formations. The major Pliensbachian–Bathonian coal-bearing clays and sands that overlie the Lower Pliensbachian Hasle Formation are distributed between both the Sorthat Formation and the overlaying Bagå Formation. The Sorthat Formation is the sister unit of the Röddinge Formation, with both being part of the same fluvial system, as well the regional equivalent of the Ciechocinek Formation of Baltic Germany and Poland, the Fjerritslev Formation of the Danish Basin and the Rya Formation on Scania. The Sorthat Formation beds were referred originally to the Levka, Sorthat and Bagå beds. A major section of the formation is the Korsodde coastal section, located on the southwest part of the island. A detailed stratigraphic interpretation of the beds has been difficult to achieve, in part due to the complicated block faulting, but especially due to the absence of marine fossils and distinct marker beds. The rocks were originally dated as Middle Jurassic using megaspore contents, with the Levka and Sorthat beds being roughly contemporaneous and the Bagå beds possibly slightly younger. Later, when more advanced palynological studies from locations such as the Levka-1 core-well and the Korsodde section Upper Pliensbachian stratum became available, the coals and clays of the Levka beds were removed from the Bagå Formation, as were the coal-dominated beds of the Korsodde and Onsbæk sections. At the time, several megaspores were found to be common in both the Bagå Formation and Sorthat beds, implying the presence of Toarcian–Aalenian strata, lthough the dating of the megaspore-bearing strata is tentative. With both, the palynological and sedimentological study of all available exposures and cores from the Lower–Middle Jurassic shows that the Hasle Formation (Lower–Middle Pliensbachian) is covered by a succession referable to both the Levka and Sorthat beds, which are composed mostly by bioturbated sands, heteroliths and clays along with abundant coal veins, and contain relatively diverse brackish to marine dinoflagellate assemblages that are indicative of upper Pliensbachian, Toarcian and possibly lower Aalenian strata. The upper stratum is covered by the fluvial gravels and sands, along with lacustrine clays, carbonaceous clays and coals belonging to the Bagå Formation.

Lithology
 
The Sorthat Formation has a highly variable lithology. The main core studied from the rocks, the Levka-1 well, reveal first sharp-based units fining upwards, 3–14 m thick, consisting of coarse-grained, occasionally pebbly sand, overlain by muddy, coal- and mica-containing, fine- to medium-grained sand that is laminated to homogeneous clay and coal seams with roots. On most of the strata there is a common parallel lamination with subordinate cross-bedding, cross-lamination and Flaser lamination. There are abundant large plant fragments and small bits of quartz. Marine palynomorphs are absent, suggesting that this level was deposited on a coastal or delta plain with fluvial channels, lakes and swamps. This is consistent with finds in the German portion of the Ciechocinek Formation, where a large deltaic system ended: the large Toarcian–Bajocian deltaic systems were the local shoreline, influenced by the proximity between brackish to freshwater and continental biofacies. The North German Basin shows that on approximately 14.4 m.a, four third-order sea-level fluctuations led the subsequent formation of four individual delta generations in the Bifrons–Thouarsense (Toarcian), Murchisonae–Bradfordensis (Aalenian) and Humpresianum–Garatiana (Bajocian). The Toarcian section was dominated by regressive elongated river-dominated deltas were due to the fall of the sea level the south to southwest directed delta progradation between the Lower and Upper Toarcian, that was deposited as 40 m of deltaic successions, found in places like Prignitz (east) and Brandenburg (north). Most of the palynomorphs found in the Toarcian stratum are connected with ones found in the Sorthat Formation.

Nearly 40 m thick, the upper section of the formation is composed mostly by a series of cross-bedded, cross-laminated, wave-rippled and bioturbated sand and heteroliths with sporadic syneresis cracks, pyrite nodules, the ichnofossils Planolites isp. and Teichichnus isp. and brackish to marine palynomorphs, mostly dinoflagellates. This upper part has a stratum more characteristic of nearshore environments with abundant lagoons, coastal lakes and fluvial channels, with the clean sand at the top probably representing a marine shoreface. The Korsodde section, 93 m thick, is composed mostly of coarse-grained sands with cross-bedding and parallel lamination, being mostly black due to an abundant organic debris. This section has been interpreted as part of the large local fluvial system, probably as a series of minor fluvial channels that were connected with coastal lakes and lagoons where riparian vegetation was abundant, judging by the presence of megaflora remains and palynomorphs. Small ichnofossil burrows and larger burrows, including Diplocraterion isp., are common, indicating that there was at least one subunit that was the fill of an estuarine channel. The uppermost part of the formation in the Korsodde section consists of fine-grained sands of yellowish to brown color with cross-stratification and parallel lamination, along with sandstones with thin bioturbated and wave-rippled heterolithic beds.

Profile
At Korsodde, the environment includes the following:

Palynostratigraphy
The Sorthat Formation represents one of the most complete floras found in Europe dating to the Pliensbachian–Toarcian boundary, as well as among Jurassic palynological deposits found worldwide.

Environment

Beyond the deposits on the west and south coast of Bornholm, the formation is present in the Stina-1 well, which belongs to the Rønne Graben (a large offshore pull-apart basin that also includes the westernmost fringe of the island of Bornholm), where both the Sorthat and the Bagå Formation are deposited on the hanging wall fault block close to the main eastern bounding fault of this graben along the west coast of the island. This graben was in part emerged during the deposition of the Sorthat Formation, as proven by the sand and clay with numerous coal horizons from the Stina-1 well. The presence of a high kaolinite content in both coeval marine Danish Basin and local Bornholm, as well the abundant reworked Carboniferous palynomorphs, indicate significant erosion of a Carboniferous regolith, which was almost completely eroded by the Middle Jurassic. This suggests Pliensbachian–Toarcian rivers eroded the Bornholm High, eliminating all of the Carboniferous layers and leaving only older paleozoic strata, as proven by the granite of the younger Bagå Formation. Due to a Late Pliensbachian marine regression, deposition of coal-bearing strata in the Sorthat Formation resumed on Bornholm until an Early Toarcian transgression terminated peat formation. The two main deposits of the formation, seen at the Levka-1 well and the lower part of the Korsodde section, were deposited in an environment influenced by the sea, the Levka location being populated by lagoons, lakes, channels and low fluvial areas. Then deposition of the Sorthat Formation in the Latest Pliensbachian–Toarcian demonstrated a rapid subsidence and relative sea level rise of the Rønne Graben, while the adjoining Arnager Block suffered a relative sea level fall. This is because the Rønne Graben experienced a rapid relative sea level rise during the Early Toarcian, coeval with the prominent rise registered in the Danish Basin. This peak transgression of the Ligurian Cycle is found in the coeval layers of the Fjerritslev Formation. The Bifrons to Levesquei zone in the coeval units at the east and west of Prignitz, a sandy coastal-deltaic succession, was replaced by laminated shales with pelagic marine fauna, reflected in the shoreline shifts to the northeast, which contributed to retrogradational stratal pattern architectures. In the Sorthat Formation, a transition occurs from upper to lower shoreface environments, indicating a deepening trend. In the Younger Levesquei subzone, delta plain environments were replaced by shoreface setting with active bioturbation and hummocky cross-stratification. The Rǿnne Graben shows seismic lines with onlapping patterns that have been correlated to these Lower Toarcian marine shoreface deposits with intense bioturbation.

The depositional environments include the following:

The Levka beds start overlying the foreshore deposits of the Hasle Formation. They are composed mostly of interbedded sand, clay and coal beds. Loose sand constitutes the main parts of the unrecovered intervals. This sand is fine to medium-grained, micaceous, very carbonaceous and muddy, showing mostly parallel lamination, with rare cross-bedding, cross-lamination and flaser lamination. These first levels are interpreted as fluvial channel fills, reflecting active channel deposition followed by decreasing current strength and channel abandonment with a passive phase of clay deposition, final overgrowth and change into peat-forming swamps. Between the channel fills are intervals with thinly interbedded sand and clay and common occurrence of rootlets, coal seams and rapid facies changes, interpreted as representing wet, vegetated, floodplain with shallow lakes, swamps and small crevasse deltas receiving overbank spills from nearby active channels. Coal seam analyses revealed that the peat-forming swamps were water-saturated, densely vegetated, anoxic and nutrient-rich. It was followed by a coastal or lower delta plain environment, populated by abundant large fluvial channels or distributaries, and nearby floodplain areas where lacustrine–lagoonal mud, crevasse splays and peat accumulated. Later a rise in the sea level is signalled by the increase of acritarchs and Tasmanites, where a lagoon succession is overlain by the fill of a coastal lake that developed into a palaeosol. Later, marine palynomorphs became absent and the location became again a crevasse delta and fill of an abandoned fluvial channel, intercalated with lake deposits. After this, a lagoon succession is marked with the appearance of Planolites and Teichichnus burrows and dinoflagellate cysts of Nannoceratopsis gracilis, N. senex and N. triceras and common occurrence of Botryococcus, indicating a major marine rise event.
The Sorthat beds consist of a series of intercalated minor or major extended lower delta plain environment deposits, with pyrite nodules and the trace fossil Arenicolites.
The Korsodde section overlies the fine-grained sandstones of the Hasle Formation, deposited on a high-energy shoreface environment. This section of the formation started as a derivative of sand units deposited in fluvial channels, with abundant carbonaceous matter probably derived from extensive erosion of peat accumulations during changes in channel courses, as indicated by the abundant presence of rootlets and coaly beds. The intrusion of younger clay beds led to a gradual infilling of relatively small coastal lakes and enclosed lagoons, which became vegetated and turned into peat-accumulating environments (isolated from active clastic sedimentation), eventually forming palaeosols. This units are filled with pyrite nodules and medium-large wood fragments, while the genera Botryococcus, Lecaniella and Mendicodinium (represented by M. reticulatum) occur in varying amounts ranging from abundant to rare, with a few acritarchs also present. This stratum is overlaid by the intercalation of crevasse delta deposits and lacustrine–brackish flooding surfaces with shifts between ordinate and subordinate tidal currents, with scattered small burrows (Diplocraterion) and mud drapes on foresets containing abundant Nannoceratopsis senex. Mancodinium semitabulatum and Mendicodinium groenlandicum are also found in this sections, but subordinated to the inner fluvial dominated part of an estuarine channel, overlaid by a tidally dominated part. Lagoons in various conditions on younger deposits suggest sea level rise, intercalated with riverine deposits, on a series of regression–transgression trends.
In the Rønne and Kolobrzeg grabens along the Arnager Block representative offshore layers of the formation appear in the Baltic Sea. In the Rønne Graben this unit is found in a landward direction towards the Arnager Block. The absence of the Sorthat Formation in the Pernille-1 borehole of the Arnager Block could be due to an inversion of the strata, although emersion of this block cannot be ruled out. The whole system is thought to have built a southeast to southwest erosion due to the seaward orientation of the Arnager Block, which tilted towards the northwest. Lagoonal to deltaic systems developed locally, fed by the currents coming from either the Skarup Platform to the west, the Bornholm High to the north and likely the Arnager Block.

Inertinite has been recovered from the coal-bearing levels of the formation, where the palynology shows that the mire vegetation may have been dominated by gymnosperms and also contained ferns characterised by the genera Dicksonia or Coniopteris and the family Osmundaceae. Biomolecules were found in several coal seams there, among which Euulminite and Attrinite were the most abundant huminite macerals recovered. The Levka-1 well section represents fluvial channels, floodplain areas with shallow lakes and lagoons, and small crevasse deltas, with abundant coalified wood fragments and stems, most of them found associated with sandy channel fills and on heavily rooted crevasse and lake deposits in shallow inter-fluvial areas. In the Toarcian at Bornholm, strata indicate a warm, humid climate suggested by the large number of plant species from the interconnected Jameson Land, and thin cutinised leaves of Podozamites and Equisetales comparable in size to modern subtropical bamboos are thought to reflect favourable conditions for plant growth. There is abundant coal, which indicates that wildfires occurred in the bog. Wood particles from this section, both charcoalified and unburned (coalified), with many particles being rounded and worn, imply the influence of greater transportation energies.

Coal

On Korsodde, the Lower Toarcian section records higher temperatures and decreased rainfall and humidity, which led to an increase of the potential for local wildfires, reflected in the increased abundance of charcoal and burnt plants. In the section at Korsodde that includes the Toarcian oceanic anoxic event, thermophilic plant taxa imply that the climate was relatively dry, and presence of micro- and macroscopic charcoal indicates a spike of abundance and increase of the wildfire activity.

Most of the coal seams recovered from the formation come from Levka 1 and the Korsodde section, and are derived in most cases from a densely vegetated, anoxic swamp, which was probably rheotrophic and rich in nutrients. Study of the peat accumulation indicates that it occurred in rather short time intervals (around 2,300 years) and in a warm temperate to subtropical climate, falling short of the rate seen in tropical accumulations, such as the 1.8 mm/yr on the Batang Hari River in Sumatra. Peat accumulation of 1 mm/yr is equal to that of modern Central Kalimantan coastal settings. The deposits have great amounts of thin and clean coal seams, covered by lacustrine–lagoonal flooding peaks, indicating rapid changes in the environment that were controlled by fairly rapid subsidence of the Rønne Graben, which along with eustatic rise in sea level caused decreases and increases in the base level at the coastal plain. The majority of the samples were immature, low-rank coals with generally very high content of humified organic matter, which indicates prevailing anoxic and fully saturated conditions during peat formation, with occasional inundations by freshwater that favoured humification of the plant tissues and also may have increased the gelification processes, raising the pH. Hopanoids are abundant and an indicator of common bacterial activity. The vegetation — both the nearby plants and those of the peat swamp — was probably small in stature, and its diversity suggests a humid, warm-temperate to subtropical climate that favoured prolific vegetation.

The Levka-1 well has a core of approx. 150 m through the Sorthat Formation, covering the underlying marine strata of the Hasle Formation. The lower part includes 112 m of coal along with sand and clay. There is abundant large, coalified wood fragments and stems. The coal-bearing strata of the Levka-1 are interpreted as fluvial channel fills, with active channel deposition followed by abandonment and a passive phase of clay deposition, gradual overgrowth and change into a peat-forming environment. clay and coal seams present in this stratum have abundant rootlets and a non-marine palynomorph assemblage dominated by spores and pollen, interpreted as representing flood plain areas with shallow lakes, small crevasse deltas and swamps. Some sections have wave ripples, wavy and flaser bedding, bioturbation and transported Equisetites stems that are interpreted as the sediment fill of a local lagoon, deposited on a transgressive shoreline with a series of lagoon successions. Levka-1 coal contains hard, black coal and is very similar petrographically, with huminite in most of the seams, some seams being up to 90% huminite. There is a dominance of macerals from detrital organic matter (humodetrinite) over macerals derived from more woody material (humotelinite). Gelinite appears as the most common component of the samples, followed by huminite.
The Korsodde section is interpreted as representing a small coastal series of lakes and protected lagoons, where at least six coal seams have been found. It represents a wet, anoxic, and probably rheotrophic, nutrient-rich peat-forming environment. Above the marine strata of the Toarcian transgression lie strata with abundant clay, fine-grained sand, and silt that contains transported, coalified pieces of wood, pyrite nodules, rootlets and a diverse microspore assemblage, in which the marine dinoflagellate Mendicodinium reticulatum is abundant. In these coal seams, the huminite maceral group comprises the majority of the organic matter, with humotelinite dominating over humodetrinite maceral. Eu-ulminite and densinite are the most prominent macerals.

Fungi

Phytoplankton
In the Lower Jurassic of Bornholm there were several successions of nearshore peat formations with dinoflagellates. Coal-bearing strata were deposited in an overall coastal plain environment during the Hettangian–Sinemurian, and then during the Early Pliensbachian deposition was interrupted until the late Pliensbachian–Lowermost Toarcian due to a sea regression.

Terrestrial palynology
In Early Toarcian carbonates, local bulk organic matter and wood fragments have been associated with carbon cycle perturbations, shedding light on the reaction of the continental biota to the Toarcian oceanic anoxic event, which accompanied large-scale volcanism. There are several changes to the woody vegetation in the wood-derived carbon, with pollen assemblages dominated by pollen types in the Sciadopityaceae and Miroviaceae, such Cerebropollenites associated with cycad pollen types (Chasmatosporites) and the hirmeriellaceous Corollina. The local palynology has shown the terrestrial changes of the local flora. In the Pliensbachian the dominant palynofacies were ones in the Cupressaceae such as Perinopollenites, along with cycads such as Cycadopites, found in mid-latitude Mediterranean climates. Then, at the start of the event the local pollen assemblages show a shift to spore-rich layers, showing a long-term increase in ferns and lycophytes, an indicator of more humid conditions. Finally, after the Toarcian anoxic event, the Sorthat Formation showed an abrupt rise of pollen of Hirmeriellaceae such as Corollina and specially Spheripollenites, both indicators of semidesertic to dry Mediterranean climates, implying an abrupt warming event coeval with the changes happening at sea.

Bryophyta

Lycophyta

Equisetales

Pteridophyta

Peltaspermales

Erdtmanithecales

Cycadophyta

Bennettitales

Ginkgoales

Coniferophyta

Fossil wood
Is also common to found wood from the nearshore deposits of Korsodde, with two sets: macroscopic wood, recognizable to the naked eye, up to branch-sized; and microscopic wood (0.25 to 1 mm average dimension). The wood has not been assigned to a concrete genu. This wood shows isotopic patterns similar to those found in the Late Palaeocene thermal maximum, and has allowed measurement of the higher atmospheric CO2 concentrations of this interval. The formation includes:

Woody material (humotelinite)
Woody plant tissues
Coalified pieces of wood
Large coalified wood fragments 
Isolated logs

Amber

Plant macrofossils 
The main deposits of macroflora are the Hasle clay pit and the Korsodde section. The flora was originally stated to be coeval with the Rhaetian–Hettangian floras of Sweden, but found later to be Pliensbachian–Toarcian. Möller did the two major studies on the local flora, with 68 species described, 50% of them ferns. The Late Pliensbachian section is dominated by ferns, suggesting a warm and humid climate, which fits with the palaeolatitude of Bornholm, firmly within the Jurassic warm biome. But the presence of Ginkoaleans and absence of large-leafed Bennettites suggest this warm climate was seasonal. Ferns and sphenophytes in the assemblage are interpreted to have occupied the forest floor. Bennettites were mid-storey shrubs, and conifers, such as Pagiophyllum, together with ginkgoaleans, make up the main arboral flora. All the flora developed on a meandering river system with well-vegetated marshy flood plains. The Toarcian section shows a radical change on the local flora, as Hirmeriellaceae conifers take over the role of dominant flora, representing 95% of the pollen recovered, along with the rise of seed ferns, Bennettites and Czekanowskiales. The dominance of Pagiophyllum and its related pollen Corollina torosus indicate high temperature and aridity with seasonal wildfires (though some sections show a low coal ratio and are derived from slightly more humid environments), with rare occurrences of Brachyphyllum and one Cyparissidium.

Fauna

Ichnofossils

Annelida

Brachiopoda

Bivalvia

Scaphopoda

Gastropoda

Crustacea

Chondrichthyes

Actinopteri

See also
List of fossiliferous stratigraphic units in Denmark
 Neringa Formation, Lithuania
 Pliensbachian formations
 Blanowice Formation, Southern Poland
 Clarens Formation, South Africa
 Mizur Formation, North Caucasus
 Fernie Formation, Canada
 Hasle Formation, Denmark
 Kota Formation, India
 Los Molles Formation, Argentina
 Mawson Formation, Antarctica
 Rotzo Formation, Italy
 Whiteaves Formation, British Columbia
 Navajo Sandstone, Utah
 Kandreho Formation, Madagascar
 Kota Formation, India
 Cattamarra Coal Measures, Australia

References 

Geologic formations of Denmark
Jurassic System of Europe
Jurassic Denmark
Pliensbachian Stage
Toarcian Stage
Shale formations
Sandstone formations
Deltaic deposits
Paleontology in Denmark
Formations